Anupam Sinha is an Indian comic book artist and writer, credited as the creator of the Raj Comics superhero Super Commando Dhruva. The BusinessWorld website said that Sinha revolutionised Indian comics with his work at Raj Comics.

Career 
Starting his career in 1975 at the age of 13 for a small magazine called Deewana Tej at Kanpur, Sinha got his “big break” four years later, when he joined Diamond Comics. While working on popular comics such as Tauji aur Jadoo Ka Danda, Tauji aur Jadugar Sambha, Lalchi Jadugar and Atyachari Ka Atank. Sinha also attended Kanpur’s Christchurch College. He worked with Diamond Comics creating Fauladi Singh comics Fauladi Singh Aur Shaitan Tarwill, Fauladi Singh Ki Tarwill se Takkar and Fauladi Singh aur Vinash Ke Pujari. In 2012, he published his very first full-length fiction, The Virtuals.

Raj Comics 
Anupam Sinha joined Raj Comics in 1987 and created Super Commando Dhruva which took the markets by storm. Due to widespread success of the narratives Sinha used to construct, he was given the task of expanding Nagraj universe. Beginning from 1995, Sinha penned many Nagraj Comics and evolved the universe to cater to a mature audience. After a brief hiatus from Nagraj, Sinha is now helming Nagraj again with Manoj Gupta in their latest and most ambitious project yet, Sarpsatra. This is also the first series to bring together the characters Nagraj and Tausi. Tausi was originally owned by Tulsi Comics but acquired by Raj Comics in 2016.

Diamond Comics

See also 
 Chitra Bharti Kathamala
 Diamond Comics
 Super Commando Dhruva
 Fauladi Singh

References

1962 births
Indian comics
Indian comics artists
Living people
 
Superhero comics